Jäger (German for "hunter") is a PCP air gun (rifle), manufactured by Klimovsk Specialized Ammunition Plant in Russia. It is used for target shooting or hunting for birds and small animals at a distance up to 100 m. It was presented in autumn 2010 at the exhibition Arms&Hunting 2010.

Description 
The rifle is equipped with a barrel produced by German company Lothar Walther with a choke.

Details

See also
 Klimovsk Specialized Ammunition Plant
 Horhe

Air guns of Russia